Eucalyptus rugulata is a species of mallet or tree that is endemic to a restricted area of Western Australia. It has smooth bark, lance-shaped adult leaves, ribbed flower buds in groups of seven, creamy white flowers and shortened spherical fruit.

Description
Eucalyptus rugulata is a mallet or tree that typically grows to a height of  but does not form a lignotuber. It has smooth grey bark that is shed in strips. Flowering has been recorded in November and the flowers are creamy white. The fruit is a woody, shortened spherical capsule with the valves protruding strongly but fragile.

Taxonomy
Eucalyptus rugulata was first formally described in 2002 by Dean Nicolle in the journal Nuytsia from material collected east of Verley in 2000. The specific epithet (rugulata) is from the Latin word rugula meaning "wrinkle" or "corrugation", referring to the distinctly wrinkled dried fruit, but also the rugged habitat where this species grows.

Distribution and habitat
This mallet grows on gravelly hills, often in more or less pure stands, between South Ironcap and Hatter Hill, east of Varley and north-east of Lake King.

Conservation status
This eucalypt is classified as "Priority Four" by the Government of Western Australia Department of Parks and Wildlife, meaning that is rare or near threatened.

See also
List of Eucalyptus species

References

Eucalypts of Western Australia
rugulata
Myrtales of Australia
Plants described in 2002